The women's vault competitions at the 2013 Mediterranean Games in Mersin was held at the Mersin Gymnastics Hall on 24 June 2013.

Format competition

The top eight qualifiers in the qualification phase (limit two per NOC), advanced to the apparatus final. Each gymnast performed two vaults. Qualification scores were then ignored, with only final round scores counting.

Schedule
All times are Eastern European Summer Time (UTC+3)

Qualifications

Finals

References

 https://web.archive.org/web/20130623012609/http://info.mersin2013.gov.tr/disiplineDetails_GA.aspx

Gymnastics at the 2013 Mediterranean Games
2013 in women's gymnastics